Pramanik or Pramanick is a Bangladeshi and Indian surname. Notable people with this name include:

Pramanik
Bhaskar Pramanik (born 1951), Indian businessman
Emaz Uddin Pramanik (born 1941), Bangladeshi politician
Hafizur Rahman Pramanik, Bangladeshi politician
Malabika Pramanik, Canadian mathematician
Nisith Pramanik (born 1986), Indian politician
Pinki Pramanik (born 1986), Indian sprinter
Pradipta Pramanik (born 1998), Indian cricketer
Shamsul Alam Pramanik, Bangladeshi politician
Manoj Kumar Pramanik, Bangladeshi actor

Pramanick
Diptendu Pramanick (1910–1989), Indian film personality
Radhika Ranjan Pramanick (1932–2020), Indian politician
Sudhamoy Pramanick (1884–1974), Indian social activist

See also